The Girl in the Spider's Web is a 2018 action-thriller film directed by Fede Álvarez and written by Jay Basu, Álvarez, and Steven Knight, and based on the 2015 novel of the same name by David Lagercrantz, which in turn is based on characters in the Millennium book series by Stieg Larsson. The film acts as a soft-reboot/sequel to David Fincher's The Girl with the Dragon Tattoo. It stars Claire Foy in the role of Lisbeth Salander and follows Salander as she battles against a mysterious notorious organization, the Spiders, who seek world dominance. Sverrir Gudnason, Lakeith Stanfield, Sylvia Hoeks, and Stephen Merchant also appear in the film.

The Girl in the Spider's Web had its world premiere at the Rome Film Festival on October 24, 2018, and was theatrically released by Sony Pictures Releasing in Sweden on October 26, 2018, and in the United States on November 9, 2018. A box-office disappointment, the film grossed $35.2 million worldwide and received mixed reviews from critics, although Foy's performance was praised.

Plot 
In the introduction, sisters Camilla and Lisbeth Salander are seen as young girls playing chess at the home of their father, crime lord Alexander Zalachenko. When Zalachenko asks Camilla to play a game with him (the implication being inappropriate sexual behaviour) Lisbeth tries to drag her away, before leaping from a high balcony into a snowdrift and making her escape, leaving Camilla behind.

Some years later, in Stockholm, Sweden, computer programmer Frans Balder hires Lisbeth, now a vigilante hacker, to retrieve Firefall, a program he developed for the National Security Agency (NSA) that can access the world's nuclear codes. Balder believes it too dangerous to exist. Lisbeth successfully retrieves Firefall from the NSA's servers, but she is unable to unlock it. Her actions attract the attention of NSA agent Edwin Needham.

Mercenaries led by Jan Holtser steal the program from Lisbeth and attempt to kill her, though she survives. When she misses a scheduled rendezvous with Balder, he mistakenly believes Lisbeth has kept Firefall for herself and contacts Gabrielle Grane, the deputy director of the Swedish Security Service (SÄPO). Grane moves Balder and his young son, August, to a safe house. Meanwhile, Needham tracks the unauthorized login to Stockholm and arrives there seeking Lisbeth and Firefall.

Lisbeth and her hacker friend, Plague, contact Lisbeth's former lover, investigative journalist Mikael Blomkvist, for help identifying her assailants. Blomkvist learns Holtser previously worked for Lisbeth's late father, Zalachenko, and is now affiliated with an elusive international crime syndicate known as the "Spiders". Lisbeth puts surveillance on Balder's safe house, and when it is attacked, she intervenes, attempting to protect Balder and his son. She is intercepted by Holtser, who kills Balder and frames Lisbeth, then kidnaps August. Lisbeth pursues them and rescues August. Lisbeth also learns the Spiders' leader is her sister, Camilla, whom Lisbeth believed was dead. Lisbeth escaped her abusive father who was literally torturing her, leaving Camilla behind after she hesitated to leave. After years of physical and sexual abuse, Camilla faked her suicide and went underground to form the Spiders.

Lisbeth takes August to another safe house, where she confirms only he can unlock Firefall. Elsewhere, Needham locates Lisbeth's girlfriend, Sofia, and persuades her to arrange a meeting between them, intending to lure Lisbeth into a trap. Lisbeth evades him, and Needham is later arrested by SÄPO. Lisbeth helps him escape in exchange for him safely escorting August to San Francisco to reunite him with his mother; she begrudgingly agrees to later give him Firefall.

The Spiders trick August by calling him from his father's cellphone, then track him to Lisbeth's safe house. Camilla and the Spiders take August to her base of operations, the sisters' native house. Grane had hired the Spiders to retrieve Firefall for her and informed them of Balder's location, but Camilla kills Grane, instead.

Using a tracker hidden on August, Lisbeth, Blomkvist, Plague, and Needham locate him. Lisbeth breaks in to give Plague remote computer access to the building's surveillance system. She is caught and taken to where August is being held. She learns that Blomkvist has also been captured. When Camilla threatens to torture him, Lisbeth tells August to trust her and to reveal the Firefall password. Camilla tries suffocating Lisbeth while describing their father's abuse.

Armed with a .50 BMG sniper rifle and remotely guided by Plague via computer, Needham fires through brick walls, eliminating Camilla's henchmen, saving August and Blomkvist. Camilla escapes with the laptop containing Firefall, and Lisbeth pursues her. Holtser, injected with a poison that induces blindness, stumbles through some woods onto a road, where he is fatally hit by Camilla's fleeing car. The vehicle crashes into the trees. Camilla, injured, escapes into the woods. Lisbeth pursues her to a nearby clifftop, where Camilla tearfully asks why she never returned to rescue her; Lisbeth says Camilla chose to remain with their father rather than escape with her. Camilla, heavily bleeding, drops the laptop computer and steps off the cliff before Lisbeth can stop her, disappearing into a snowy mist and apparently falling to her death.

Needham attempts to access Firefall, only to discover Lisbeth has destroyed it. August is reunited with his mother in the United States. Blomkvist writes an investigative article about the Spider's Web to be published in Millennium, but then deletes it. Lisbeth destroys her native house as closure, then rides away on her motorcycle.

Cast 
 Claire Foy as Lisbeth Salander, a computer hacker who has survived severe emotional and sexual abuse
 Beau Gadsdon as young Lisbeth Salander
 Sverrir Gudnason as Mikael Blomkvist, a journalist for Millennium and lover/partner of Lisbeth
 Lakeith Stanfield as Edwin Needham, an NSA security expert who is tracking Salander
 Sylvia Hoeks as Camilla Salander, Lisbeth's estranged sister, who is the head of a major crime syndicate
 Carlotta von Falkenhayn as young Camilla Salander
 Stephen Merchant as Frans Balder, a terminated employee of the NSA who developed a program called Firefall, which accesses the world's nuclear codes. He requests Salander's help in destroying his program, which he believes to be too powerful for any player.
 Vicky Krieps as Erika Berger, the publisher of Millennium
 Claes Bang as Jan Holtser, Camilla's accomplice
 Christopher Convery as August Balder, Frans' son
 Synnøve Macody Lund as Gabriella Grane, the deputy director of the Swedish Security Service
 Cameron Britton as Plague, a close associate of Lisbeth's, and a computer expert to whom she reaches out when she needs assistance
 Andreja Pejić as Sofia, Lisbeth's lover/partner
 Mikael Persbrandt as Alexander Zalachenko,  Lisbeth and Camilla Salander's father
 Volker Bruch as Peter Ahlgren

Production 

In November 2015, The Hollywood Reporter announced that Sony Pictures Entertainment was planning to develop a new film series based on the Millennium novels, starting from the book The Girl in the Spider's Web by David Lagercrantz. Rooney Mara and Daniel Craig, who portrayed Salander and Blomkvist, respectively, in The Girl with the Dragon Tattoo, would not be back for the film. New actors would be cast, and David Fincher would also not return as director, though he later received an executive producer credit. Steven Knight was announced to be in talks to adapt the novel, while the producers would be Scott Rudin, Amy Pascal, and Elizabeth Cantillon, along with Yellow Bird's Berna Levin, Søren Stærmose, and Ole Sondberg. TheWrap reported that Alicia Vikander was being considered for the role of Salander. However, while promoting Carol, Mara stated that she was still signed for the sequel: "As far as I know I'm doing it until someone tells me otherwise". Tatiana Maslany, Jane Levy and Troian Bellisario were also linked to the project.

In November 2016, Variety reported that Sony was in negotiations with Fede Álvarez to direct the film, with Eli Bush as an additional producer. In March 2017, it was announced that the film would feature an entirely new cast, with production set to begin in September 2017. In May 2017, it was reported that Claire Foy was the frontrunner to play Salander, and, in September 2017, Foy was officially cast in the film. Sylvia Hoeks joined the cast in October 2017. The rest of the cast was announced over the next five months.

Principal photography began in January 2018 in Berlin, Leipzig Airport then moved to Hamburg February 2–4, for filming at the Kattwyk Bridge; and ended in April 2018, in Stockholm.

Composer Roque Baños was chosen to score the movie. The recording took plate at the newly opened Synchron Stage Vienna in Austria.

Release 
The Girl in the Spider's Web was released in the United States on November 9, 2018 by Sony. It was originally scheduled for October 5, 2018, but was moved in March 2017. The first trailer was released on June 7, 2018. The film premiered at the Rome Film Festival on October 24, 2018.

Reception

Box office 
The Girl in the Spider's Web worldwide gross was $35 million, against a production budget of $43 million. Having failed to recover its production budget, it emerged a box-office bomb.

In Canada and the United States, The Girl in the Spider's Web was released alongside The Grinch and Overlord, and was projected to gross $10–15 million from 2,929 theaters in its opening weekend. It made $3 million on its first day, including $635,000 from Thursday night previews. It went on to debut to $8 million, down from the $12.8 million opening of the first film and finishing fifth at the box office. The film fell 68% in its second weekend to $2.8 million, finishing ninth.

Critical response 
The website's critical consensus reads, "The Girl in the Spider's Web focuses on the action elements of its source material for a less complex – and only sporadically effective – franchise reboot." On Metacritic, the film has a weighted average score of 43 out of 100, based on 42 critics, indicating "mixed or average reviews". Audiences polled by CinemaScore gave the film an average grade of "B" on an A+ to F scale, while PostTrak reported filmgoers gave it a 75% positive score.

Manohla Dargis of The New York Times was critical of Alvarez's action filmmaking touch-ups being "a bummer, at times risible" and giving the story "a wash of murky hues and murkier narrative developments". Chris Nashawaty of Entertainment Weekly gave the film an overall C grade, calling it "a disappointingly safe, by-the-numbers action-thriller" that will be "a letdown for fans who once embraced Salander's bold queerness and bleak nihilism." Peter Sobczynski of RogerEbert.com commended Alvarez for staging the action scenes in a "slick and efficient manner," but criticized the overall film for having a "genuinely terrible story" with "ham-handed storytelling" and reducing Lisbeth Salender to "a nondescript female action hero" with dialed down characteristics. Greg Cwik of Slant Magazine heavily panned Alvarez's film for using "a slick but lifeless aesthetic" that rips off David Fincher's Seven and "suffers from a compulsion to be capital-C cool" with its overly stylistic touches, concluding with: "From its aping of Fincher's style to its purloining of clichés from so many James Bond films and action thrillers before it, The Girl in the Spider's Web is simply chasing the ghosts of other films."

Many critics praised Foy for her portrayal of Lisbeth Salender. Deborah Young of The Hollywood Reporter wrote that Foy did a "respectable job" as the character, while Will Gompertz of BBC.com said she did a "reasonable job in a limited role" that doesn't go beyond "being a cartoonishly two-dimensional action hero". Brian Truitt of USA Today said, "To her credit, Foy gives her a default cold demeanor and businesslike drive that is nicely upended later on when things do get personal." Rolling Stones Peter Travers called her "killer good" in the role for "supplying the nuance and grace notes that the too-busy script leaves out." Katie Rife of The A.V. Club wrote that Foy gave an "interesting performance" that "splits the difference between [Rooney] Mara's mannered interpretation of the character and [Noomi] Rapace's more vulnerable work in the role". Kate Erbland of IndieWire felt that Foy gave "the best on-screen depiction of Lisbeth yet," saying she makes her "more human" than the previous incarnations and delivers "a heroine not only worth cheering for, but one worth loving and even understanding."

References

External links 
 
 

2018 films
2018 action thriller films
2018 crime action films
2018 crime thriller films
2010s American films
2010s British films
2010s Canadian films
2010s English-language films
2010s German films
2010s Swedish films
American action thriller films
American crime action films
American crime thriller films
American sequel films
American vigilante films
British action thriller films
British crime action films
British crime thriller films
British sequel films
British vigilante films
Canadian action thriller films
Canadian crime thriller films
Canadian LGBT-related films
Canadian sequel films
Canadian vigilante films
Columbia Pictures films
Dragon Tattoo Stories (film series)
English-language Canadian films
English-language German films
English-language Swedish films
Films about domestic violence
Films about terrorism in the United States
Films about the National Security Agency
Films about twin sisters
Films based on Swedish novels
Films directed by Fede Álvarez
Films produced by Amy Pascal
Films produced by Scott Rudin
Films scored by Roque Baños
Films set in Stockholm
Films shot in Berlin
Films shot in Stockholm
Films with screenplays by Fede Álvarez
Films with screenplays by Steven Knight
German action thriller films
German crime action films
German crime thriller films
German sequel films
German vigilante films
Metro-Goldwyn-Mayer films
Regency Enterprises films
Swedish action thriller films
Swedish crime thriller films
Swedish sequel films
Swedish vigilante films
Techno-thriller films